Awkat Hossain is a Bangladeshi film editor, writer and director. He won Bangladesh National Film Award for Best Editing for the film Dui Poisar Alta (1982)

Filmography

As a writer 
 Mayer Dabi – 1986
 Bondhu Amar – 1992

As a director 
 Mayer Dabi – 1986
 Bondhu Amar – 1992

As editors

Awards and nominations
National Film Awards

References

External links

1951 births
Living people
Bangladeshi film editors
Best Editor National Film Award (Bangladesh) winners
Bangladeshi film directors
Bangladeshi screenwriters
People from Dhaka District